Anderson Family Field is a college softball stadium on the campus of the California State University, Fullerton.  It is the home venue of the Cal State Fullerton Titans softball team. It is named for four members of the Anderson family, who donated funds to update the stadium.

The stadium has been renovated three times: in 1992, 1995, and 2000.  A fourth major renovation is in progress as of 2021.

References

College softball venues in the United States
Cal State Fullerton Titans softball
Softball venues in California
Sports venues in Fullerton, California
1985 establishments in California
Sports venues completed in 1985